Compere or Compère may refer to:

French surname 
Loyset Compère (c. 1445–1518), French composer of the Renaissance
Claude Antoine Compère (1774–1812), French general in the French Revolutionary Wars and the Napoleonic Wars
Louis Fursy Henri Compère (1768–1833), French general in the French Revolutionary Wars and the Napoleonic Wars
René Compère (1906–1969), Belgian jazz trumpeter
Adéodat Compère-Morel (1872–1941), French Socialist politician and agronomist
Léon Compère-Léandre (c. 1874–1936), Martiniquais shoemaker, survivor of the Mount Pelée eruption in 1902

Other uses 
 Compere (host), a master of ceremonies
 Les Compères, a 1983 French comedy film

French-language surnames